Sar Syeddan is a village in Bagh District, Azad Kashmir, Pakistan, about three kilometres from Bagh city. It has a population of 3000 and is one of the areas having the highest literacy in District Bagh. It has two schools and the earliest one was established in 1948 by a renowned social worker and a prominent figure Syed Muhammad Sarwar Gardezi. The present Vice Chancellor of Azad Jammu & Kashmir university Dr Syed Dilnawaz Gardezi and Director General Health Services AJK Dr Syed Mushtaq Gardezi belong to this village. Besides many senior bureaucrats of AJK Government, army officers, engineers, doctors and educationists also come from this small village. It is a village of famous Gardezi Sadaat who happen to be the descendants of Syed Shah Yousuf Gardezi Multani.

References

Villages in Pakistan
Bagh District